Bhandara Lok Sabha constituency was a former Lok Sabha (parliamentary) constituency in Maharashtra state in western India. With the delimitation of the parliamentary constituencies in 2008, based on the recommendations of the Delimitation Commission of India constituted in 2002, this constituency ceased to exist. A new constituency, Bhandara-Gondiya came into existence in place of it.

Assembly segments
Bhandara Lok Sabha constituency comprised the following Vidhan Sabha (Legislative Assembly) segments:
 Tumsar
 Bhandara
 Tirora
 Gondiya
 Goregaon (now defunct)
 pauni

Members of Lok Sabha

^ by-poll

See also
 Bhandara-Gondiya Lok Sabha constituency ( 2009 elections of 15th Lok Sabha onwards)
 Gondia Lok Sabha constituency ( 1962 election to 3rd Lok Sabha)

Notes

Former constituencies of the Lok Sabha
Former Lok Sabha constituencies of Maharashtra
2008 disestablishments in India
Constituencies disestablished in 2008